The Boree Islands are two small islands  west of Point Widdows, Enderby Land. They were plotted from air photos taken from Australian National Antarctic Research Expeditions aircraft in 1956, and named by the Antarctic Names Committee of Australia after "boree", a vernacular name for some species of acacia found in Australia.

See also 
 List of Antarctic and sub-Antarctic islands

References 

Islands of Enderby Land